"Hicaz Hümâyun Saz Semâisi" is a piece of music written by Neyzen Yusuf Paşa (1820-1884) that demonstrates the many ways in which Turkish music and European music differ.  The time signature of this song is in 10/8 and it features multiple Dal Segno signs. The key signature for the song is a C and a B.

Another version of "Hicaz Hümâyun Saz Semâisi" was composed by Veli Dede (?-1768).

See also
Hicaz
Saz Semâisi
Hicaz Hümâyun

Further reading

Instrumentals
Turkish music
19th-century songs
Songwriter unknown
Year of song unknown